Kjeld Olesen (born 8 July 1932, in Copenhagen) is a Danish former Social Democratic politician.

His father was among the resistance members against Nazi Germany during World War II. In 1955 Olesen was part of the CIA team who secretly listened in the leftist politicians Ragnhild Andersen and Alfred Jensen. He also worked in a private intelligence organisation called Arbejdernes Informations Central (Danish: Information Centre of the Labour Movement) financed by the labour movement. Its employers were members of the Social Democratic Party. Later, Olesen became a member of Parliament (1966–1987) and served as deputy chairman of the Social Democratic Party in the 1970s. He served in several cabinet positions, most notably as foreign minister and defence minister. Following his exit from politics he resumed his old profession as a sailor.

References

External links

This article is based on the corresponding article on the Danish Wikipedia, accessed on 3 May 2006.

1932 births
Living people
Danish Defence Ministers
Foreign ministers of Denmark
Members of the Folketing
Social Democrats (Denmark) politicians
Politicians from Copenhagen
Transport ministers of Denmark
Danish sailors
Danish spies